Kiss Kiss Kill Kill is the third album by the Danish punk trio HorrorPops. The cover and songs convey a cinematic theme (particularly those with repressed female protagonists and escapist themes, the obvious example being the track "Thelma and Louise"). The album art mimics archetypical B-movie posters, promising "Twelve Tales About Love and Murder... Starring HorrorPops". Only "Boot to Boot" doesn't conform to the film formula. Inspired by the rioting in Copenhagen that followed the destruction of the Ungdomshuset(Youth House), an anarcho-punk squat and self-managed social centre, by police forces in 2007. Of the album's sound, lead singer Patricia Day stated in the Hellcat review of the album that the band was started "So that we could play all kinds of music [but]... We really wanted to get back to the classic new wave feel that we love. And I think our excitement about these songs has made a hell of difference."

References

2008 albums
albums recorded at Sound City Studios
HorrorPops albums